South Yemen national football team had only participated in one AFC Asian Cup, during 1976 edition. It was South Yemen's only participation in their history, until Yemeni unification at 1990. After 1990, South and North Yemen were together reunited, but South Yemen was not recognized as predecessor of modern Yemen team.

1976 Asian Cup

Group B

References

Countries at the AFC Asian Cup